Top Sergeant is an alternate name for First sergeant

It may also refer to:

 Top Sergeant (film), a 1942 American military drama film directed by Christy Cabanne
 Top Sergeant (book), a 1992 autobiography of Sergeant Major of the Army William G. Bainbridge